Wentworth is a town in Grafton County, New Hampshire, United States. The population was 845 at the 2020 census, down from 911 at the 2010 census. The town is home to Plummer's Ledge Natural Area, and part of the White Mountain National Forest is in the northeast. The town has a picturesque common, presided over by a Federal-style church and bordered by antique homes.

History
It was granted by Governor Benning Wentworth on November 1, 1766, to John Page and 60 others. Named for the governor himself, Wentworth was settled and incorporated the same year. Many of the settlers arrived from Massachusetts, particularly Salisbury. With a pretty New England common set atop an elevated tongue of land, the village has been noted since the 19th century for its charm; while in "... beauties of landscape, Wentworth has a more than ordinary share."

Farmers cultivated the rich soil on the intervales. The Boston, Concord & Montreal Railroad diagonally crossed the town. With abundant water power from the Baker River, Wentworth developed into a lumber-producing town with nine sawmills. But disaster struck on August 6, 1856, when dams on the Upper and Lower Baker ponds in Orford breached during a flood, releasing a wall of water down Pond Brook to the Baker River. It raced  down the steep, rocky channel, then undermined and washed away Wentworth's riverside
mills, houses, barns, sheds and roads.

Geography
The town is drained by the Baker River and its South Branch, part of the Pemigewasset and Merrimack River watersheds.

The town is crossed north to south by New Hampshire Route 25 and New Hampshire Route 118. New Hampshire Route 25A starts at Routes 25 and 118 at the town center and proceeds west into Orford.

Demographics

As of the census of 2000, there were 798 people, 310 households, and 220 families residing in the town.  The population density was 19.2 people per square mile (7.4/km).  There were 437 housing units at an average density of 10.5 per square mile (4.1/km).  The racial makeup of the town was 97.62% White, 0.38% African American, 0.25% Asian, 0.13% from other races, and 1.63% from two or more races. Hispanic or Latino of any race were 0.38% of the population.

There were 310 households, out of which 31.9% had children under the age of 18 living with them, 60.0% were married couples living together, 7.4% had a female householder with no husband present, and 29.0% were non-families. 21.3% of all households were made up of individuals, and 8.4% had someone living alone who was 65 years of age or older.  The average household size was 2.57 and the average family size was 3.04.

In the town, the population was spread out, with 25.8% under the age of 18, 5.8% from 18 to 24, 29.6% from 25 to 44, 24.7% from 45 to 64, and 14.2% who were 65 years of age or older.  The median age was 40 years. For every 100 females, there were 100.4 males.  For every 100 females age 18 and over, there were 101.4 males.

The median income for a household in the town was $44,219, and the median income for a family was $47,917. Males had a median income of $31,250 versus $24,500 for females. The per capita income for the town was $18,258.  About 6.1% of families and 7.9% of the population were below the poverty line, including 9.7% of those under age 18 and 2.6% of those age 65 or over.

Government
Wentworth uses a town meeting form of government administered by a three-member Board of Selectmen serving staggered three-year terms, with one seat elected each year.  In the New Hampshire General Court, Wentworth is in the Grafton 11th and 16th House Districts, represented by Beth Folsom (R) and Jeffrey Greeson (R), respectively. Wentworth is in Senate District 2, represented by Bob Giuda (R).

Climate

According to the Köppen Climate Classification system, Wentworth has a warm-summer humid continental climate, abbreviated "Dfb" on climate maps.

Photo gallery

Notable people 

 Charles Henry Turner (1861–1913), US congressman
 Thomas Whipple, Jr. (1787–1835), US congressman

References

External links
 
 Webster Memorial Library
 Wentworth Elementary School
 New Hampshire Economic and Labor Market Information Bureau Profile

Towns in Grafton County, New Hampshire
Towns in New Hampshire